This is a list of Canadian television related events from 1997.

Events

Debuts

Ending this year

Television shows

1950s
Country Canada (1954–2007)
Hockey Night in Canada (1952–present)
The National (1954–present).

1960s
CTV National News (1961–present)
Land and Sea (1964–present)
Man Alive (1967–2000)
The Nature of Things (1960–present, scientific documentary series)
Question Period (1967–present, news program)
W-FIVE (1966–present, newsmagazine program)

1970s
Canada AM (1972–present, news program)
the fifth estate (1975–present, newsmagazine program)
Marketplace (1972–present, newsmagazine program)
100 Huntley Street (1977–present, religious program)

1980s
Adrienne Clarkson Presents (1988–1999)
CityLine (1987–present, news program)
Fashion File (1989–2009)
Just For Laughs (1988–present)
Midday (1985–2000)
On the Road Again (1987–2007)
Venture (1985–2007)

1990s
 Black Harbour (1996–1999)
 Comics! (1993–1999)
 Due South (1994–1999)
 Life and Times (1996–2007)
 The Passionate Eye (1993–present)
 Royal Canadian Air Farce (1993–2008)
 The Red Green Show (1991–2006)
 The Rez (1996–1998)
 This Hour Has 22 Minutes (1993–present)
 Traders (1996–2000)
 Wind at My Back (1996–2000)
 Witness (1992–2004)

TV movies

Television stations

Debuts

Network affiliation changes

See also
 1997 in Canada
 List of Canadian films of 1997

References